Kaita may refer to:

Kaita, Hiroshima, a town in Japan
Kaita, Fukuoka, a former town in Japan
Kaita, Nigeria, a Local Government Area in Katsina State
Sani Kaita, a Nigerian footballer
Korean American IT Association, a non-profit professional association of Koreans in IT fields